James Terrell may refer to:

James C. Terrell (1806–1835), American politician
Jim Terrell (born 1965), American sprint canoer
James Terrell (physicist), name given to Terrell rotation

See also
Terrell James (born 1955), artist
James Turrell (born 1943), American artist